José Guadalupe Cruz Núñez (born Wednesday 22 November 1967 in Acopeo, Michoacán, Mexico) is a Mexican former professional footballer and manager. He coached Atlante during the 2009 FIFA Club World Cup in Abu Dhabi, United Arab Emirates.

Playing career
As a player, Cruz was a member of the Atlante side that won the 1993 Mexican championship.

Managerial career
His close association with the club has continued into his coaching career. Two years into his second spell at the club, he has overseen a league title triumph and the Champions League victory that secured their spot in the 2009 FIFA Club World Cup. He generally favours an attacking style of play, although he has neutered this instinct somewhat during the Apertura, where he has typically operated with just one out-and-out striker.

On 26 August 2013, Cruz was appointed as manager of Monterrey after parting company with Víctor Manuel Vucetich.

Honours

Player
Atlante
 Mexico Primera División: 1992–93

Manager
Atlante
 Mexico Primera División: Apertura 2007
 CONCACAF Champions League: 2008–09

Puebla
 Copa MX: Clausura 2015

References

External links

Profile of José Guadalupe Cruz on allsoccerplayers.com 
José Guadalupe Cruz on insidefutbol.com
 

1967 births
Living people
Footballers from Michoacán
Mexican footballers
Atlante F.C. footballers
Querétaro F.C. footballers
Mexican football managers
Atlante F.C. managers
Chiapas F.C. managers
C.F. Monterrey managers
Atlético Morelia managers
Club Puebla managers
Dorados de Sinaloa managers
Atlas F.C. managers
Liga MX managers
Association football defenders
Club Necaxa managers